The Master of the Banderoles (active  1450–1475) was an anonymous engraver who is thought to have worked in the northern Netherlands, perhaps in Geldern or Overijssel. He is named for his use of "banderoles", or speech scrolls in his prints. His technique has been characterized as "crude" and "clumsy", and most of the 130 engravings attributed to him are copies after other artists such as Master E. S. and Rogier van der Weyden. Arthur Mayger Hind similarly describes the artist as "of small original power, but of some interest as a copyist".

References 

 Georg Dehio: Kupferstiche des Meisters von 1464. Munich 1881 Digitized copy
 Max Lehrs: Der Meister mit den Bandrollen. Ein Beitrag zur Geschichte des ältesten Kupferstiches in Deutschland. Dresden, 1886.
 A. Lockhart: Four engravings by the Master with the Banderoles. In: The bulletin of the Cleveland Museum of Art, 60.1973, pp. 247–254

External links
 
 Entry for Master of the Banderoles on the Union List of Artist Names

Banderoles
Dutch engravers
Medieval Dutch people
15th-century people of the Holy Roman Empire
15th-century engravers